Bryce Chudak (born March 21, 1995) is a retired Canadian pair skater, who most recently competed with Natasha Purich.

Career 
Chudak previously competed with Bryn Hoffman, winning the junior silver medal at the 2016 Canadian Championships and competing at the 2016 World Junior Championships in Debrecen, Hungary. They placed sixth in the short program, tenth in the free skate, and eighth overall.

Hoffman/Chudak had previously withdrawn from the 2014 Canadian Championships due to Chudak's shoulder injury. They were coached by Anabelle Langlois and Cody Hay in Calgary, Alberta.

Programs 
(with Purich)

(with Hoffman)

Competitive highlights 
JGP: Junior Grand Prix

With Purich

With Hoffman

References

External links 
 

1995 births
Canadian male pair skaters
Living people